Terre Haute and its metropolitan area are served by public school districts and private schools. Terre Haute also has three local universities.

Colleges and universities
Indiana State University
Ivy Tech Community College of Indiana - Terre Haute campus
Rose-Hulman Institute of Technology
Saint Mary-of-the-Woods College

Public school systems

Vigo County School Corporation

VCSC is the school district for Terre Haute and Vigo County. It operates three traditional high schools along with two alternative schools and numerous elementary and middle schools.
Terre Haute North Vigo High School
Terre Haute South Vigo High School
West Vigo High School
Washington Alternative High School
McLean Education Center

Southwest School Corporation
The Southwest School Corporation serves a portion of Sullivan County, Indiana. 
Sullivan High School

Northeast School Corporation
The Northeast School Corporation serves a portion of Sullivan County, Indiana. 
North Central High School
Union High School

Clay Community Schools
CCS serves all of Clay County and a portion of Parke County. 
Clay City High School
Northview High School

North Vermillion Community School Corporation
The NVCSC serves the northern portion of Vermillion County. 
North Vermillion High School

South Vermillion Community School Corporation
The SVCSC serves the southern portion of Vermillion County. 
South Vermillion High School

Private schools
Saint Patrick School
John Paul II Catholic High School

References

Education in Vigo County, Indiana
Education in Vermillion County, Indiana
Education in Clay County, Indiana
Education in Sullivan County, Indiana
Terre Haute metropolitan area